Australopilus is a fungal genus in the family Boletaceae. Circumscribed in 2012, it is monotypic, containing the single Australian species Australopilus palumanus.

References

External links
 

Boletaceae
Fungi native to Australia
Monotypic Boletales genera